The 2011 Great West Conference baseball tournament took place from May 24 through 28.  All eight of the league's teams met in the double-elimination tournament to be held at University of North Dakota's Harold Kraft Memorial Field in Grand Forks, ND.  Utah Valley won their second championship by a score of 10-6.  As the Great West is a new conference, the league does not have an automatic bid to the 2011 NCAA Division I baseball tournament.

Seeding
The top four finishers from the regular season will be seeded one through four.

Results

All-Tournament Team
The following players were named to the All-Tournament Team.

Most Valuable Player
Chris Benson was named Tournament Most Valuable Player for the second year in a row.  Benson was an outfielder for Utah Valley.

References

Tournament
Great West Conference baseball tournament
Great West Conference Baseball